Four ships of the Royal Navy have borne the name HMS Escort:

 was a 14-gun sloop, formerly a French privateer. She was captured in 1757 and sold in 1768.
 was a 12-gun gun-brig launched in 1801 and transferred to Customs in 1815.
 was an  wooden screw gunboat launched in 1856 and broken up in 1865.
 was an E-class destroyer launched in 1934. She was torpedoed in 1940 and foundered three days later.

Royal Navy ship names